Scott Baltz is an American politician who served as Democratic member of the Arkansas House of Representatives from 2013 to 2019. Baltz is a retired firefighter and EMT.

Elections
2012 With District 61 Representative John Catlett redistricted to District 73, to challenge incumbent Republican Representative Lori Benedict (redistricted from District 82), Baltz was unopposed for the May 22, 2012 Democratic Primary, and won the November 6, 2012 General election with 5,429 votes (51.4%) against Representative Benedict.

References

External links
Official page at the Arkansas House of Representatives

Scott Baltz at Ballotpedia
Scott Baltz at OpenSecrets

Place of birth missing (living people)
Year of birth missing (living people)
Living people
American firefighters
Democratic Party members of the Arkansas House of Representatives
People from Pocahontas, Arkansas
21st-century American politicians